Meiringen Alpbach railway station is a railway station in the municipality of Meiringen, in the Swiss canton of Bern. It is located on the  Meiringen–Innertkirchen line of the Meiringen-Innertkirchen-Bahn (MIB). The station is adjacent to the Alpbach river, which flows into the Aare at Meiringen.

Services 
Since the December 2020 timetable change, the following services stop at Meiringen Alpbach:

References

External links 
 

Railway stations in the canton of Bern
Meiringen-Innertkirchen-Bahn stations